Tricholoma fissilifolium is an agaric fungus of the genus Tricholoma. Found in Singapore, where it grows on rotting wood in forests, it was described as new to science in 1994 by English mycologist E.J.H. Corner.

See also
List of Tricholoma species

References

fissilifolium
Fungi described in 1994
Fungi of Asia
Taxa named by E. J. H. Corner